John C. Clarke was a member of the Wisconsin State Assembly.

Biography
Clarke was born on Anglesey in Wales on February 17, 1831. He died on December 14, 1906 and is buried in Wausau, Wisconsin.

Career
Clarke was a member of the Assembly in 1882. Previously, he had been Sheriff of Marathon County, Wisconsin; Chairman of the Marathon County Board; a member of the Wausau City Council and Mayor of Wausau. In 1893, Clarke became Postmaster of Somo, Wisconsin. Additionally, he was a Marathon County municipal judge from 1859 to 1892 and a delegate to the 1876 Democratic National Convention.

References

People from Anglesey
Welsh emigrants to the United States
Politicians from Wausau, Wisconsin
People from Lincoln County, Wisconsin
Democratic Party members of the Wisconsin State Assembly
Mayors of places in Wisconsin
Wisconsin city council members
Wisconsin postmasters
Municipal judges in the United States
Wisconsin sheriffs
1831 births
1906 deaths
19th-century American politicians
19th-century American judges